The 2004 Toyota Grand Prix of Long Beach was the first round of the 2004 Bridgestone Presents the Champ Car World Series Powered by Ford season, held on April 18, 2004 on the streets of Long Beach, California.  It was the first event for the new Champ Car World Series which was created when Gerald Forsythe, Kevin Kalkhoven, Paul Gentilozzi and Dan Petit purchased the bankrupt CART series' liquidated assets in an Indianapolis courtroom the previous January.  Bruno Junqueira won the first Champ Car-era pole while Paul Tracy took the first win.

Qualifying results

*The time of Oriol Servià from qualification session #1 was disallowed after his car failed post-session technical inspection.

Race

Caution flags

Lap leaders

 New Race Record Paul Tracy 1:44:12.348
 Average Speed 91.785 mph

External links
 Full Weekend Times & Results
 Friday Qualifying Results
 Saturday Qualifying Results
 Race Box Score

References

Long Beach
Long Beach
Grand Prix of Long Beach